This was the first edition of the tournament.

Isabella Shinikova won the title after Natalija Kostić retired in the final at 6–3, 2–0.

Seeds

Draw

Finals

Top half

Bottom half

References

Main Draw

Oeste Ladies Open - Singles